Shades of Green is a resort owned by the United States Department of Defense (DOD) in the city of Bay Lake, Florida, near Orlando, Florida on Walt Disney World Resort property. It is one of five Armed Forces Recreation Centers (AFRC) resorts and a part of the military's Morale, Welfare, and Recreation program (MWR). The resort, which was expanded between 2004 and 2006, is self-supporting and operates from non-appropriated funds and all profits are put back into the resort.

Resort details
Shades of Green is located near the Magic Kingdom, just southwest of the Polynesian Village Resort. The resort is not, however, on the monorail loop that services the Magic Kingdom and Epcot. Transportation around Walt Disney World is provided exclusively by a separate fleet of buses which shuttle guests to and from the Transportation and Ticket Center, Disney's Animal Kingdom, Disney's Hollywood Studios, Disney Springs and the water parks.

Shades of Green does not have a pervasive theme like other Disney resorts, and the general decor is that of a modern country club. Exposed roof beams and arches of hewn stone give the resort an American Craftsman feel. The main staircase encircles a two-story rock formation with waterfalls flowing through it. The resort is located in a wooded setting complete with waterfalls and tropical gardens.

The standard room offered at Shades of Green is larger than the standard rooms in the Walt Disney World Resort. The resort also has 11 suites that can accommodate up to eight people. The resort has two lighted tennis courts, two heated swimming pools, a children's pool, hot tub, fitness center, arcade and laundry facilities.

Because the resort is owned and operated by the U.S. Military, merchandise sold within the resort is exempt from sales tax, and rooms are exempt from hotel tax. The lease requires that the resort must meet Disney standards.

The resort was designed to provide a vacation spot for the US service members and their families. It is a retreat for military personnel of all ranks, their families and their guests. The resort offers discounted prices for hotel rooms and discounts on theme park tickets. The resort's motto is Serving Those Who Serve. Specific eligibility must be met before making a reservation. As guests enter Shades of Green, there are five service flags framing an immense rock formation with five waterfalls, each a tribute to the five branches of military service. Rising above the setting is a larger American flag and a smaller POW/MIA flag.

History

Shades of Green originally opened as a Disney-owned resort known as the Golf Resort in December 1973 with 151 rooms. The Golf Resort was located in the middle of the Palm and Magnolia golf courses. The resort was built of wood and volcanic rock in the style of a country club. The core building of the resort was opened in 1971 as a two-story clubhouse for the golf courses and did not actually have guest rooms. Guest wings were added to the original clubhouse in 1973 due to the need for overnight accommodations. Every guest room at the resort felt like a suite with at least .

The hotel's full-service Pro Shop offered an instructional program called the "Golf Studio", which was conducted by professionals for players of any age and playing level. The resort provided a restful atmosphere with pleasant views from the guest rooms. The Golf Resort was known for the Magnolia Room restaurant with its signature dessert, French Fried Ice Cream. The Magnolia Room, later the Trophy Room, served breakfast, lunch and dinner in a large, open room complete with a high-timbered ceiling with live entertainment.

The entertainment was usually provided by a guitar playing and singing duo called Amos and Charles. Their shows were a combination of soft rock, bluegrass, country and folk music. The Players Lounge was a large windowed lounge that overlooked the Magnolia Golf Course. The recreation at the resort included two lighted tennis courts and a pool, now the Magnolia Pool, which had three water spouting columns in the shallow portion of the pool. There were also two putting greens at the resort.

The resort only had an occupancy rate of 60% to 75% most of the year while Disney's Polynesian Resort and Disney's Contemporary Resort had an occupancy rate of almost 100%. One of the major problems with the resort was its location.

Most travel agents and tourists did not really consider The Golf Resort to really be a "Disney" resort. The resort was expanded and renamed The Disney Inn in February 1986 to try to appeal to more than golfers. It received an additional 150 rooms with a new Snow White theme during that renovation. The resort was still small though for Disney standards. The resort described itself as having the rustic charm of a quiet country inn. Rooms were decorated in a bright and airy style. The sitting area had pale green paint, an oak table and chairs, along with a chandelier and a pull out couch.

The bedroom was painted in a light tan color and had an oak armoire and oak headboards. The beds had floral quilts and there was a small reading chair in the corner. Dining options included "The Garden Gallery", which is still in operation, with a bright and airy setting, provided a nice spot for relaxed dining and offered American cuisine. "The Back Porch" was a lounge at the resort.

A snack bar named "The Diamond Mine" and the "Sand Trap", a poolside bar, were two other dining options. Recreation included the diamond mine arcade, swimming in the two pools, jogging, playing tennis on one of the two courts, and playing golf on either of the two challenging championship courses next to the resort. Rates from the early 1990s for the Disney Inn ranged from $195.00 a night for two queen beds and a sleeper sofa to $500.00 for suites.

By the early 1990s, Army officials had decided it was time to build a resort in the continental United States. Orlando was the top choice in a market survey of soldiers. On February 1, 1994, the US Department of Defense leased the resort and the land it sits on with a 100-year lease to use for the MWR program and limited the resort to eligible guests. In 1996, the resort was purchased outright, for $43 million, due to the high success of the resort, although Disney still owns the land on which the resort sits.

The resort was renamed Shades of Green. Since its opening, it has been running at or near 100% capacity. The name of the resort refers to the colors of the different uniforms. While all services have different colored Class A Uniforms, all war-fighting uniforms have some shade of green. The resort previously had a small cafe located near the lobby called Cafe Belle and a lounge called the Back Porch. The resort temporarily closed on April 1, 2002, in order to allow the demolition of the original building and commence the construction of a brand new building. The resort's renovation took nearly two years to complete and finally re-opened to the public on March 31, 2004. This major expansion from 2002 to 2004 gave the resort a capacity of 586 guest rooms. KBJ Architects was the main architect of the resort expansion.

During the time of the renovation, guests were able to stay at Disney's Contemporary Resort at Shades of Green daily rates. The aim of the renovation was to create an even better resort that included more guest room options, meeting space, additional fine dining and more guest amenities. The renovation remodeled the guest rooms in the Magnolia Wing, doubled the number of guest rooms, added ten family suites, additional dining options,  of meeting facilities, a fitness center and a multi-level, 500 space parking garage.

Eagles Lounge, which served light fare and drinks, closed in 2008.

Guest rooms
Guest rooms are located in the two wings of the resort, the Magnolia Wing and the Palm Wing. There is also a sitting area that includes a table and chairs. The bathrooms are large and include double sinks with granite counter tops and a separate room for the toilet and shower.

Each room has a large closet, dressers, a night stand, and a color television. Each room has either a patio or private balcony with two chairs and a table that overlooks either the pool, the courtyard gardens, or the golf courses. Other amenities include a coffee maker, refrigerator, in-room safe, hair dryer, iron and ironing board, in room movies, and internet access. The resort also has 11 family suites.

Suites include a separate bedroom with king size bed and a full bath, living area with two queen size sofa beds, and an additional full bath. Room rates are based on pay grade. The maximum amount of rooms that can be reserved by one person is three. Rooms are comparable to those of Deluxe Disney resorts.

Dining and Shopping

 Evergreens - Sports Bar and Grill.
 Mangino's - Shades of Green's fine dining option.
 The Garden Gallery - A full service family restaurant with themed buffets include a selection of international cuisine and a fresh fruit, soup, and salad bar.
 Express Cafe - The counter service restaurant includes breakfast sandwiches, pastries, snacks, fresh coffee, tea, and more. The express cafe is located next to the resort Bus Area.
 Java Cafe - The lobby location that serves Starbucks coffee and assorted pastry items, ice-cream, floats, and beer and wine.
 On the Greens Grill - Is located between the Magnolia Pool and the Magnolia golf course. Serves hot dogs, Italian sausage, hamburgers, sandwiches, quick snacks and cold drinks.
 Exchange - A small convenience store with products including: soda, snacks, film, postcards, T-shirts, sunglasses, and toiletries. Magazines, books, and newspapers are also available, in addition to beer, wine, and tobacco products.

Fitness Facilities

 Fitness Center - The fitness center is open from 0700 to 2200 for guests' exclusive use. It is located on the first floor near Manginos. A jogging path runs from Shades of Green to Disney's Polynesian Village Resort, Disney's Grand Floridian Resort and Spa, and the Transportation and Ticket Center.
 Tennis Courts - Two hard surface, lighted tennis courts are located on the property and open 24 hours.
 Swimming Pools - Shades of Green has two recreational pools. The Magnolia pool has a walk in entry or use the hot tub located there. There is also the Magnolia Pool Bar which serves grilled hot dogs, sausages, hamburgers, light snacks, and drinks. The Millpond Pool is in the shape of a Mickey Mouse head with large water slide. There is also a children's wading pool with water playground and small water slide located adjacent to the playground. The Millpond Pool Pavilion provides towel service. Both pools have areas for sun chairs, tables, and umbrellas.

Banquet and meeting facilities
The Magnolia Ballroom can accommodate up to 350 guests for conferences, meetings, wedding receptions, banquets, and themed events. The Ballroom can be subdivided into four equal sections for smaller groups. There are also several breakout rooms with various layouts. There are five boardrooms located on the fifth floor of the Palm Wing.

Walt Disney World privileges

Shades of Green guests have full transportation to all Walt Disney World theme parks, provided by Escot Bus Lines, with Shades of Green wrapped buses. The resort offers direct bus transportation to Disney's Animal Kingdom and Hollywood Studios theme parks. However, it does not offer direct bus transportation to the Magic Kingdom or Epcot. Guests traveling to the latter two theme parks may either take a bus to the Transportation and Ticket Center and transfer to the monorail there or may take a ten-minute walk to the nearby Disney's Polynesian Village Resort and board the monorail on the second floor. There is bus transportation offered to Disney Springs and to either of the Walt Disney World water parks (Disney's Blizzard Beach and Disney's Typhoon Lagoon).

Shades of Green is considered a Disney-owned resort for purposes of Extra Magic Hours at the theme parks. However, due to its ownership by the Department of Defense, it does not have certain amenities that are exclusive to other Disney-owned resorts. Room charging off Shades of Green property is not available. Resort guests are not eligible for the Disney Dining Plan. It did not participate in the now-discontinued Magical Express program, which provided complimentary transportation for guests and luggage directly to the Disney resort from Orlando International Airport, skipping baggage claim. Shades of Green guests are required to pay for daily parking at Disney World's theme parks if they drive their car.

Eligible guests may purchase discounted admission tickets for the Walt Disney World Resort parks and other Orlando-area parks and activities at the Shades of Green Attraction and Ticket Sales Office which is located on the lobby level. A Military Identification Card or a Department of Defense Identification Card must be presented at the time of purchase. Most of these tickets may be used by any person; the only restriction is that the purchaser be one of the eligible persons listed above.

As of December 2017, Shades of Green guests are now able to link their reservations to the My Disney Experience page on the Disney website, which also allows them to secure FastPass+ reservations 60 days in advance, as opposed to the original 30 day.

Eligible guests
Because Shades of Green is an AFRC resort, it is not open to the general public. Reservations may only be made by

 Current Active-component members of the United States Armed Forces.
 Current Reserve and National Guard members.
 Retired from active component, Reserves, and National Guard with or without pay (gray area). 
 Honorably discharged veterans with 100% Disabled Veterans (DVA) service-connected disability certified by the Department of Veterans Affairs (VA).
 Recipients of the Medal of Honor.
 Current and retired civilian employees of the Department of Defense (DoD) and Coast Guard (CG).

People who do not meet these eligibility requirements may stay at Shades of Green so long as they are on vacation with a sponsor who is an eligible person.

"Salute To Our Veterans" is a program that started in 2010, which allows all military veterans who have received an honorable discharge (verified by current DD Form 214) the opportunity to vacation at Shades of Green during January and September.

The Shades of Green Survivors’ Family Program is a program for eligible Family members who have suffered a loss of a sponsor in the event of an Active Duty death regardless of the cause (combat, accident, suicide or illness.) and also may be uniformed personnel.

Room rates are based on rank and/or pay grade. The rates are adjusted on a sliding scale, with prices increasing with rank and pay grade.

Golf
Shades of Green is surrounded by two PGA Championship golf courses, Disney's Palm and Magnolia as well as the nine-hole Oak Trail. Both have a driving range and putting green.

Disney's Oak Trail is a nine-hole, par-36 course, designed with holes ranging from 132 to 517 yards.

References

External links

 
Armed Forces Recreation Centers Official Site
Shades of Green Information Expanded Information

Hotel buildings completed in 1973
Armed Forces Recreation Centers
Buildings and structures in Lake Buena Vista, Florida
Hotels in Walt Disney World Resort
Tourist attractions in Orange County, Florida
1973 establishments in Florida